Charles E. James, Sr. was the Deputy Assistant Secretary of the Office of Federal Contract Compliance Programs from 2001 to 2009 during the administration of George W. Bush.

He returned to the federal government in 2017 to direct the Office of Civil Rights at the United States Department of Transportation.

Personal
His wife, Kay Coles James served as the director for the United States Office of Personnel Management from 2001 to 2005 in the George W. Bush administration. He is the father of three grown children.

See also
List of OFCCP DAS

References

United States Department of Labor officials
United States Department of Transportation officials
Living people
Virginia Republicans
African-American politicians
Year of birth missing (living people)
21st-century African-American people